Poul Jøhrens Korup (28 January 1926 – 5 September 2003) was a Danish rower. He competed at the 1948 Summer Olympics in London with the men's eight where they were eliminated in the round one repêchage.

References

1926 births
2003 deaths
Danish male rowers
Olympic rowers of Denmark
Rowers at the 1948 Summer Olympics
Rowers from Copenhagen
European Rowing Championships medalists